Adagio in G minor for strings and organ, also known as Adagio in Sol minore per archi e organo su due spunti tematici e su un basso numerato di Tomaso Albinoni (Mi 26), is a neo-Baroque composition commonly attributed to the 18th-century Venetian master Tomaso Albinoni, but actually composed by 20th-century musicologist and Albinoni biographer Remo Giazotto, purportedly based on the discovery of a manuscript fragment by Albinoni. There is continuing scholarly debate about whether the alleged fragment was real, or a musical hoax perpetrated by Giazotto, but there is no doubt about Giazotto's authorship of the remainder of the work.

Provenance
The composition is often referred to as "Albinoni's Adagio" or "Adagio in G minor by Albinoni, arranged by Giazotto". The ascription to Albinoni rests upon Giazotto's purported discovery of a manuscript fragment (consisting of a few opening measures of the melody line and basso continuo portion) from a slow second movement of an otherwise unknown Albinoni trio sonata.

According to Giazotto, he obtained the document shortly after the end of World War II from the Saxon State Library in Dresden which had preserved most of its collection, although its buildings were destroyed in the bombing raids of February and March 1945 by the British and American Air Forces. Giazotto concluded that the manuscript fragment was a portion of a church sonata (sonata da chiesa, one of two standard forms of the trio sonata) in G minor composed by Albinoni, possibly as part of his Op. 4 set, around 1708.

In his account, Giazotto then constructed the balance of the complete single-movement work based on this fragmentary theme. He copyrighted it and published it in 1958 under a title which, translated into English, reads "Adagio in G minor for strings and organ, on two thematic ideas and on a figured bass by Tomaso Albinoni". Giazotto never produced the manuscript fragment, and no official record has been found of its presence in the collection of the Saxon State Library.

The piece is most commonly orchestrated for string ensemble and organ, or string ensemble alone, but with its growing fame has been transcribed for other instruments.

In popular culture
The Adagio has been used in many films, television programmes, advertisements, recordings, and books. Notable occurrences include:
 In 1961 as the main theme of Alain Resnais's Last Year at Marienbad
 In the 1962 Orson Welles film The Trial
 For Renaissance's 1974 album Turn of the Cards on the track "Cold Is Being"
 In the original 1975 version of the film Rollerball
 In the 1975 episode Dragon's Domain of Space 1999
 For The Doors' 1978 album An American Prayer on the track "A Feast of Friends"
 In Butterflies, the UK sitcom 1978-1983
 In the 1981 Peter Weir film Gallipoli
 In the 1983 film Flashdance
 Yngwie Malmsteen, in "Icarus Dream Suite Op. 4" (1984)
 In the 1991 film The Doors at the Père Lachaise Cemetery scene
 In the 1998 song "Anytime, Anywhere" from the album Eden by Sarah Brightman
 In the 1998 song "Don't Go Away" by Sweetbox off their eponymous album
 A 1999 crossover song in English and Italian, "Adagio," by Lara Fabian
 A 2000 Russian-French-Spanish stop-motion short called "Adagio"
 For Tiësto's 2004 song "Athena" performed live at the 2004 Summer Olympics opening ceremony and featured in the album Parade of the Athletes
 In the 2016 film Manchester by the Sea by Kenneth Lonergan
 Wolf Hoffmann recorded a neo-classical metal version, released in his Headbangers Symphony album (2016)
 In the 2018 series The Assassination of Gianni Versace: American Crime Story
 In season 5, episode 4 of the animated TV show Bob's Burgers

References

External links
, Academy of St Martin in the Fields, Neville Marriner - no longer available

Musical hoaxes
Compositions by Remo Giazotto
1958 compositions
Music for orchestra and organ
1950s hoaxes
Compositions in G minor
Tomaso Albinoni
Compositions with a spurious or doubtful attribution